Avenel railway station is located on the North East line in Victoria, Australia. It serves the town of Avenel, and it opened on 20 November 1872.

History

In 1875, the goods shed was destroyed by fire, and was replaced in the following year. A permanent station building was provided in 1881, which had been replaced by the 1970s.

Platform 1, which faced the former broad gauge track on the eastern side, was originally on a loop siding off the main line, with the main line slewed to its present location during rationalisation of the yard.

In 1972, No. 4 road was abolished, with No. 5 road renumbered to No. 4 road. By December 1991, No. 4 road and siding "B" were abolished. Further sidings and roads were abolished in July 1997, as well as all signals, effectively leaving Avenel as a "through" station.

As part of the North East Rail Revitalisation Project, a second platform was constructed on the 1960s built standard gauge line, in conjunction with the standard gauge conversion of the existing broad gauge track. It was completed in August 2010.

The station is now under the care of a group of local volunteers, who meet every Friday morning to maintain the station and surrounding gardens. They have also restored the building, including the McKenzie & Holland lever frame.

Former station Mangalore was located between Avenel and Seymour, while Monea, Locksley, Longwood and Creighton stations were located between Avenel and Euroa.

Platforms and services

Avenel has one island platform with two faces. It is serviced by V/Line Albury line services.

Platform 1:
 services to Southern Cross

Platform 2:
 services to Albury

Gallery

References

External links
Victorian Railway Stations gallery

Railway stations in Australia opened in 1872
Regional railway stations in Victoria (Australia)